Roche-à-Bateaux is a commune in the Côteaux Arrondissement, in the Sud department of Haiti. In 2009, the municipality had 16,727 residents.

Settlements

References

Populated places in Sud (department)
Communes of Haiti

History
Roche-à-Bateaux was hit by a category 4 tropical storm in 2016, Hurricane Matthew directly passed over the Sud department of Haiti over the course of 36 minutes. 50 people were killed as a result of the 9.8ft (3m) storm surge which hit the coastal town, strong winds of 145mph also destroyed 62% of homes in the municipality.